Atlanta, GA 1998 is a live release by Athens, Georgia's Widespread Panic. These performances were recorded live at The Fox Theatre in Atlanta, GA on January 2, 1998. This was the final show of the 1997 New Year's run.  This recording features all original band members including late guitarist Michael Houser.

The show features numerous guest appearances from Count M'Butu, Reverend Jeff Mosier, Randall Bramblett, Chris Yuella and Col. Bruce Hampton.

Track listing

Disc 1
Tie Your Shoes (Widespread Panic)  - 8:55	 
Tall Boy (Widespread Panic)  - 11:16	 
Hatfield (Widespread Panic)  - 11:08	 
Happy Child (Widespread Panic)  - 1:21	 
Dear Mr. Fantasy (Capaldi/Windwood) - 6:01	 
Gradle (Widespread Panic)  - 5:58	 
Sleeping Man (Vic Chesnutt) - 7:22	 
Chunk Of Coal (Billy Joe Shaver) - 6:15	 
Weight Of The World (Widespread Panic)  - 5:44	 
Worry (Widespread Panic)  - 7:22

Disc 2
Ain't Life Grand (Widespread Panic)  - 5:19	 
Contentment Blues (Widespread Panic)  - 6:02	 
Postcard (Widespread Panic)  - 5:43	 
Jack (Widespread Panic)  - 7:48	 
Airplane (Widespread Panic)  - 12:45	
Low Rider (War) - 10:18	 
Drums (Widespread Panic)  - 12:08

Disc 3
I Walk on Guilded Splinters (Rebbenack) - 14:01	
Space Wrangler (Widespread Panic)  - 9:40	 
Low Spark Of High Heeled Boys (Capaldi/Winwood) - 9:24	 
Time is Free  (David Earle Johnson) - 7:12	 
Low Spark Of High Heeled Boys (Capaldi/Winwood)  - 5:04

Personnel

Widespread Panic
  John Bell – Vocals, Guitar
 Michael Houser – Guitar, Vocals
 Dave Schools – Bass
 Todd Nance – Drums
 John "Jojo" Hermann – Keyboards, Vocals
 Domingo "Sunny" Ortiz – Percussion

Production
 Recorded by Daniel Friedman
 Post-Production by Matt DeCamp

References

External links
 Widespread Panic website
 Widespread Panic Archives Blog

Widespread Panic live albums
2012 live albums